Dejan Kralj (born 28 June 1976 in Ljubljana) is a Slovenian slalom canoeist who competed at the international level from 1992 to 2012.

He won a bronze medal in the K1 team event at the 2005 ICF Canoe Slalom World Championships in Penrith. He also won five medals in the same event at the European Championships (3 golds, 1 silver and 1 bronze).

Kralj finished tenth in the K1 event at the 2000 Summer Olympics in Sydney.

World Cup individual podiums

References

1976 births
Canoeists at the 2000 Summer Olympics
Living people
Olympic canoeists of Slovenia
Slovenian male canoeists
Sportspeople from Ljubljana
Medalists at the ICF Canoe Slalom World Championships